Kati Sar (also Romanized as Katī Sar; also known as Kūtī Sar) is a village in Karipey Rural District, Lalehabad District, Babol County, Mazandaran Province, Iran. At the 2006 census, its population was 427, in 102 families.

References 

Populated places in Babol County